Lucy Alexander Winchester (born January 11, 1937) is a Kentucky socialite and farmer who served as the 14th White House Social Secretary during the entirety of the Presidency of Richard Nixon and First Lady Pat Nixon.

Early life and career 
Winchester was born in Lexington, Kentucky as Lucy Moulthrop Alexander. She attended Sweet Briar College and Finch College, and earned a bachelor's degree from the University of Kentucky. She worked as a clerk and typist in a variety of roles, including the Leo Burnett Company in New York City and a clerk and guide at the United States Mission to the United Nations.

During Winchester's first marriage, she was a housewife and owner and manager of a family farm. In 1968, she was a volunteer for the Nixon-Agnew ticket.

Government positions 

Winchester worked in the White House from 1969 until Nixon's resignation in 1974. After Nixon left office, she was named Assistant Chief of Protocol at the United States Department of State and remained in close contact with the Nixon family.

Winchester's files are preserved by the White House Historical Association and the Richard Nixon Presidential Library and Museum. She was also invited to a private luncheon and tea with First Lady Laura Bush.

Personal life 
In 1962, she married William I. Winchester. They divorced in 1966.

Winchester was married to former Governor of Kentucky Edward T. Breathitt, Jr .

References 

Living people
People from Lexington, Kentucky
1937 births
University of Kentucky alumni